Lexar International is a brand of flash memory products manufactured by the Chinese memory company Longsys.
The Lexar "JumpDrive" trademark was often used synonymously with the term USB flash drives when the technology was first adopted.

History

Early years (1996-2006) 

Lexar was founded as an American manufacturer of digital media products based in San Jose, California. Products manufactured by Lexar include SD cards, CompactFlash cards, USB flash drives, card readers and solid-state drives.  Once a division of Cirrus Logic, Lexar leveraged its parent company's experience in building ATA controllers in developing its own flash controllers. Lexar was spun off from Cirrus Logic in 1996. Lexar was created by Petro Estakhri and Mike Assar.

In 2005, Lexar was awarded $380 million in a lawsuit against Toshiba who copied Lexar's flash memory technology.

Under Micron ownership (2006-2017) 

Lexar was acquired by Micron Technology in 2006, and subsequently merged with Crucial Technology under the name Lexar Media, a subsidiary of Micron. In September 2007, Lexar extended its agreement with Eastman Kodak Company to develop and market Kodak-branded flash memory products worldwide.

On June 26, 2017, Micron (the then-owner of the brand) announced it was to discontinue the Lexar retail removable media storage business and put part or all of the business up for sale.

Under Longsys ownership (2017-present) 

On August 31, 2017, the Lexar brand and trademark rights were acquired by Longsys, a flash memory company based in Shenzhen, China.

In 2018, Lexar reentered the flash storage market.

In January 2019, the company unveiled the first SD card with a storage capacity of 1 terabyte (TB).

In December 2019, Lexar demonstrated a prototype 7.5 GB/s PCIe 4.0 SSD which is set to be the world's fastest consumer SSD.

In April 2020, Lexar released its world's smallest memory card (nCARD) featuring Xtacking tech from Yangtze Memory Technology (YMTC).

In June 2020, Lexar announced its entry to the DRAM market by unveiling seven different DDR4-2666 memory kits for mainstream laptops and desktops. Lexar also plans to release faster, 3000 MHz and 3200 MHz memory kits in the future, along with kits "with heatsinks and RGB lighting", targeting gamers and enthusiasts.

USB FlashCard
USB FlashCard is a flash memory card format developed by Lexar, and announced on December 13, 2004.

There is a wide range of existing memory card formats such as SD, xD, and CompactFlash; the major advantage of USB FlashCard is that the cards are in fact standard USB flash drives.  The USB FlashCard uses a modified USB Type A plug which keeps the total thickness of the card to under 4.5 mm.  Because of its small size and USB compatibility, a USB FlashCard could, for example, be accessed by either a digital camera or a modern personal computer without the need for a card reader.

Lexar has published the specifications for its USB FlashCard form factor on its website in an open and royalty-free format, in the hopes that other memory card and portable device manufacturers will adopt it.

The specifications for the USB FlashCard published by Lexar show its dimensions to be 31.75 mm × 12 mm × 4.5 mm.  The volume is comparable to the widely adopted SD cards (32 mm × 24 mm × 2.1 mm).  The USB FlashCard has nearly the same length as the SD card, but is half as wide, and approximately twice as thick.

References

External links

 

1996 establishments in California
2006 mergers and acquisitions
2017 mergers and acquisitions
American companies established in 1996
American subsidiaries of foreign companies
Computer companies established in 1996
Computer companies of the United States
Computer memory companies
Corporate spin-offs
Manufacturing companies based in San Jose, California
Micron Technology
Technology companies based in the San Francisco Bay Area